MET's School of Engineering is a private engineering college situated in Mala, Thrissur District of Kerala, India. The college is affiliated to All India Council for Technical Education (AICTE) New Delhi, and the University of Calicut. MET'S is the acronym for Mala Education Trust. MET's School of Engineering was established  in 2002.

Courses 
MET's School of Engineering offer the following courses:

B.Tech undergraduate streams:
 Computer Science and Engineering
 Electronics and Communication Engineering
 Electrical and Electronics Engineering
 Biotechnology Engineering
 Mechanical Engineering
 Civil Engineering

M.Tech postgraduate streams:
 Electronics and Communication Engineering (VLSI Design)
 Biotechnology Engineering
 Computer Science and Engineering

References

Engineering colleges in Thrissur district
All India Council for Technical Education
Colleges affiliated with the University of Calicut